is a retired Nippon Professional Baseball infielder with the Hokkaido Nippon Ham Fighters.

External links 

1974 births
Living people
Baseball infielders
Baseball people from Tokyo
Hokkaido Nippon-Ham Fighters players
Japanese baseball players
Nippon Ham Fighters players
Asian Games medalists in baseball
Baseball players at the 1998 Asian Games
Medalists at the 1998 Asian Games
Asian Games silver medalists for Japan